This article shows all participating team squads at the 2003 Women's Pan-American Volleyball Cup, held from Monday June 30 to Saturday July 5, 2003 in Saltillo, Coahuila, Mexico.

Head Coach: Lorne Sawula

Head Coach: Luis Felipe Calderon

Head Coach: Sergio Hernández

References
 Volleyball Canada  (Archived 2009-05-14)

S
P